Bechi is an Italian surname. Notable people with the surname include:

Gino Bechi (1913–1993), Italian operatic baritone
Luigi Bechi (1830–1919), Italian painter
 (born 1970), Italian basketball coach

See also
Bechis

Italian-language surnames